Acacia chrysochaeta is a shrub belonging to the genus Acacia and the subgenus Juliflorae that is endemic to a small area of north western Australia.

Description
It has terete, finely veined and densely haired branchlets that are mostly brown but quite yellowish towards the apices. Like most species of Acacia it has phyllodes rather than true leaves. It blooms between May and June or in October to November producing yellow flowers.

Distribution
It is native to an area of the Kimberley region of Western Australia. The shrub grows in sandy alluvium especially along watercourses in remote areas from around the Gibb River to around Karungie Station as a part of open Eucalyptus savannah communities.

See also
List of Acacia species

References

chrysochaeta
Acacias of Western Australia
Plants described in 1983
Taxa named by Bruce Maslin